André Miguel Lapa Ricardo (born 23 August 2000), known as André Ricardo, is a Portuguese professional footballer who plays as a winger for Greek Super League club PAOK.

Career

Famalicão
Andre Ricardo was born in August 2000 in Lisbon and from 2013 to 2017 he was in the infrastructure departments of Benfica, from there he transferred to U19 Braga and then transferred to U23 of Famalicão. He was the main figure of the latest edition of the Revelation League. In a training course that started at Benfica and ended at FC Famalicão, with a spell at Braga, André Ricardo celebrated the rise of the under-19 team of the Famalicenses to the I National Division. He made his Primeira Liga debut for Famalicão on 8 August 2021 in a game against Paços de Ferreira.

PAOK
He signed for PAOK FC as a free agent.

Career statistics

Club

References

External links
 
 

2000 births
Footballers from Lisbon
Living people
Portuguese footballers
Portuguese expatriate footballers
Association football forwards
F.C. Famalicão players
Primeira Liga players
Super League Greece players
PAOK FC players
Portuguese expatriate sportspeople in Greece
Expatriate footballers in Greece